Maryvonne de Saint-Pulgent (born Le Gallo; 13 March 1951, in Châlons-sur-Marne) is a French musicologist and member of the Conseil d’État.

Career 
Holder of a master's degree in humanities, Maryvonne de Saint Pulgent continued her studies at Sciences Po then at the École nationale d'administration (ENA, class Guernica).

In parallel with her studies, Maryvonne de Saint Pulgent pursued a musical education. First prize of piano at the Conservatoire de Paris, author of books on music and opera, she has been an associate professor of music and musicology at the Paris-Sorbonne University. She has been a correspondent of the Académie des Beaux-Arts in the musical composition section since 9 June 1993. She has been an editorialist for the weekly Le Point and is a columnist and producer at France Culture.

A member of the Board of Directors of Sciences Po Aix since spring 2015, she was elected president at the end of April and succeeded Christine Lagarde.

She is married to Noël Chamboduc de Saint Pulgent. She was with him a member of the Club de l'horloge until 1979.

Publications 
1979:  La Jurisprudence communale, Le Dictionnaire communal
1982: George Gershwin, Paris, Mazarine, 1982 (in collab. with Denis Jeambar)
1991: Le Syndrome de l'opéra, Paris, Robert Laffont
1999: Le Gouvernement de la culture, by Éditions Gallimard, 
2003: with Pierre-Jean Benghozi and Thomas Paris, Mondialisation et diversité culturelle : le cas de la France, Paris, 84 p., Notes of the Ifri 51, series Réactions et réponses à la mondialisation.
2008: with Pierre Joxe, Serviteur de la République : entretiens avec Maryvonne de Saint-Pulgent, Paris, L'Aube
2009: Culture et communication, les missions d'un grand ministère, series "Découvertes Gallimard" (nº 539), 
2010: L'Opéra-comique : le gavroche de la musique, Paris, series "Découvertes Gallimard" (nº 567)
2010: Cinquante ans après : culture, politique et politiques culturelles : colloque du cinquantenaire du ministère de la Culture et de la Communication des 13, 14 et 15 octobre 2009, under the direction of Élie Barnavi and Maryvonne de Saint Pulgent, Paris, Comité d'histoire du ministère de la Culture et des institutions culturelles-La Documentation française
2013: Jack Lang, batailles pour la culture : dix ans de politiques culturelles, Paris, Comité d'histoire du ministère de la Culture et des institutions culturelles-La Documentation française

Prefaces
2011: 
2016: Guy Saez (pref. Maryvonne de Saint Pulgent), La musique au cœur : Regards sur l'action publique de Marcel Landowski, Paris, Comité d'histoire du ministère de la Culture et de la Communication - Documentation française, series "Travaux et documents", 
2016: Françoise Mosser (pref. Maryvonne de Saint Pulgent), Entretiens avec Jean-Philippe Lecat, ministre de la Culture et de la Communication (1978–1981), Paris, Comité d'histoire du ministère de la Culture et de la Communication - Documentation française, coll. "Travaux et documents", 2016

Honours and decorations 
 Chevalier (31 December 1996), officier (13 July 2005) then commandeur de la Légion d'honneur (8 avril 2012).
 Commandeur of the National Order of Merit.
 Commandeur des Arts et des Lettres

References

External links 
 File on the website of the Académie des beaux-arts
 Maryvonne Saint Pulgent on France Culture
 Maryvonne de Saint Pulgent on CanalAcadémie
 Quel projet pour la France ? on L'Express (27 January 2000)

Carrefour de l'horloge people
20th-century French journalists
21st-century French journalists
French radio producers
French composers
French women composers
20th-century French musicologists
21st-century French musicologists
Women musicologists
Sciences Po alumni
Conservatoire de Paris alumni
Commandeurs of the Légion d'honneur
Commanders of the Ordre national du Mérite
Commandeurs of the Ordre des Arts et des Lettres
1951 births
People from Châlons-en-Champagne
Living people
Women radio producers